The 1957–58 1re série season was the 37th season of the 1re série, the top level of ice hockey in France. Chamonix Hockey Club won their 16th league title.

Final ranking
 1st place: Chamonix Hockey Club
 2nd place: Athletic Club de Boulogne-Billancourt
 3rd place: Club des patineurs lyonnais
 4th place: Ours de Villard-de-Lans
 5th place: Athletic Club de Boulogne-Billancourt 2
 6th place: Sporting Hockey Club Saint Gervais
 7th place: US Métro
 8th place: ?
 9th place: ?
 10th place: Paris HC

External links
List of French champions on hockeyarchives.info

Fra
1957–58 in French ice hockey
Ligue Magnus seasons